Coriky is an American punk rock band made up of Ian MacKaye (Minor Threat, Fugazi, The Evens), Amy Farina (The Warmers, The Evens), and Joe Lally (Fugazi, The Messthetics).

History
In 2015, Farina and MacKaye, who played together in The Evens, began playing music with Joe Lally (Fugazi, The Messthetics). In 2018, the group played their first show, now with the adopted moniker Coriky. During early 2020, Coriky released two songs, "Clean Kill" and "Too Many Husbands" via various free streaming services. Although the self-titled debut album was originally set for release on March 27, 2020, the COVID-19 lockdown enacted in the United States during March, 2020, delayed its release until June 12, 2020, in part to accommodate independent record stores closed due to the pandemic.

The band previewed their album at a free show in D.C.'s St. Stephen and the Incarnation Episcopal Church on February 22, 2020.

Upon release the record was favorably reviewed, and compared and contrasted to MacKaye and Farina's other band The Evens, and to MacKaye and Lally's other band Fugazi.

Discography
Coriky (2020, Dischord)

References

External links
 Coriky at Dischord Records
 Coriky's Bandcamp page

Dischord Records artists
Indie rock musical groups from Washington, D.C.
American musical trios